A by-election was held on 3 February 2022 in the parliamentary constituency of Southend West following the murder of the Conservative MP Sir David Amess on 15 October 2021. Amess had been the MP for the constituency since 1997, and previously represented the nearby seat of Basildon from 1983-1997. Similarly to the 2016 Batley and Spen by-election—held after Labour MP Jo Cox was murdered—the major opposition parties declined to stand out of respect for Amess. The Conservative candidate Anna Firth won the by-election with 86% of the vote, with a turnout of 24%. No other candidate reached the 5% threshold to save their election deposit.

Background

On 15 October 2021, Amess, who had been the MP for the Southend West constituency for more than 20 years, was stabbed multiple times at a constituency surgery, and was later pronounced dead at the scene despite efforts to treat his injuries. Amess was first elected to represent the seat in 1997. His death left the seat vacant, triggering the by-election. His funeral was held on 22 November 2021. The writ setting the date of the by-election was moved on 5 January 2022, with the date of the election being set for 3 February.

The constituency is one of two covering Southend-on-Sea in Essex. The other seat is Rochford and Southend East. Other towns in the seat include Leigh-on-Sea and Westcliff-on-Sea. It voted Leave by 56% to 44% in the 2016 EU referendum.

Southend West has elected Conservative MPs since it was created in 1950. Prior to Amess, the seat had only had two other MPs: Henry Channon (1950–1958), and his son Paul Channon (1959–1997), who served in the government of Margaret Thatcher as Trade and Industry secretary and Transport secretary.

Candidates 
In the days after the murder of Amess, the Labour Party, the Liberal Democrats, the Green Party and Reform UK each stated they would not field a candidate in opposition to the Conservative nominee. This follows the precedent set by the Conservatives and other major parties in the 2016 Batley and Spen by-election following the murder of Labour MP Jo Cox. Patrick Maguire, writing in The Times, was critical of this decision, citing the 1990 Eastbourne by-election following the assassination of the constituency's MP by the Provisional Irish Republican Army (IRA), which was contested by all the major parties and saw the seat change hands.

The Southend West Conservative Association said they wanted a local person selected to be the candidate. The party said they were waiting until after Amess' funeral on 22 November to select their candidate. Applications were opened on 25 November.

The following were reported as applying: Gavin Chambers, Epping Forest District councillor; Anna Firth; Seena Shah; Andrew Sheldon, leader of Castle Point Borough Council; Tamkeen Shaikh, previously stood for Southend Borough Council, and for Barking at the 2019 general election; Kevin Buck, James Courtenay and Alex Bright, Southend councillors; and Katie Channon, the daughter-in-law of Paul Channon, Southend West MP until 1997.

On 11 December 2021, Firth was selected as the Conservative candidate. She unsuccessfully contested Erith and Thamesmead in 2015 and Canterbury in 2019, and was a barrister and councillor on Sevenoaks Council. She was the chair of the Conservative Policy Forum.

The British Freedom Party said their leader, Jayda Fransen, would stand. She had most recently stood as an independent in the 2021 Batley and Spen by-election, finishing in 15th place with 50 votes, or 0.13% of the vote.

UK Independence Party (UKIP) announced its immigration spokesman Steve Laws as a candidate. The announcement, which the party linked to its critiques of the Conservative Party's immigration policy, was condemned by the Conservatives and a Labour councillor.

Graham Moore represented the English Constitution Party, which fielded a candidate for the first time.

Catherine Blaiklock was the founder and first leader of the Brexit Party, before moving to the English Democrats.

Olga Childs stood as an unaligned independent.

The candidates in the election were announced on 11 January 2022.

Campaign
It was reported in The Times on 15 January 2022 that Conservative campaigners believed that the effect of the Downing Street parties controversy would mean the "turnout could be dire", citing comments by a "veteran activist" that they had been "met with a wall of disapproval such that [they] have never had before in 25 years of doing this."

On 21 January 2022, Childs announced via her campaign Twitter account that she would not be campaigning due to ill health. She asked voters to ignore her name on the ballot paper.

During the campaign, Firth stressed continuity with Amess. Anderson, Downton and Fransen were all opposed to further lockdowns and COVID-19 vaccine mandates for healthcare staff, while Blaiklock, Fransen and Laws all supported greater immigration controls. Jason Pilley talked about protecting health services, ending the "war on drugs" and making cannabis a legalised and regulated industry. A report by Hope not Hate on the candidates in the by-election noted that Pilley's manifesto also called for the far-right activist Tommy Robinson (Stephen Yaxley-Lennon) to be appointed to the House of Lords. Moore said he would ask the Government to make Southend a free port.

Results

The number of spoilt ballot papers rose four-fold to 1,084, greater than the number of votes for any of the losing candidates. Some bore remarks critical of the Prime Minister Boris Johnson which a BBC analysis described as "a sign that events in Westminster have played out here at the polls". Firth said that the low turnout and high number of spoilt ballot papers were not connected to the ongoing government Partygate scandal, arguing that "you would expect a high number of spoilt ballots in an election where there is actually no left wing candidate standing at all". The 24% turnout was just below that in the 2016 Batley and Spen by-election – which was similarly uncontested by the opposing main parties after the murder of the previous MP – and the third lowest since 1945.

Previous result

Footnotes

References

External links 
 Video of result declaration and winner's speech from local newspaper Essex Live
 Full results from Southend-on-Sea Borough Council
 Full results from local newspaper Essex Live

By-election, 2022
By-elections to the Parliament of the United Kingdom in Essex constituencies
2020s in Essex
2022 in England
2022 elections in the United Kingdom
February 2022 events in the United Kingdom